Events from the year 1662 in Denmark.

Incumbents 

 Monarch - Frederick III

Events 
 February 19 - A royal decree introduces the subdivision Amt as a replacement for the len subdivision.

Undated 
 First Danish cadastral survey is completed over the summer.

Births

Full date unknown

Deaths 
 8 April - Birgitte Thott, translator, writer and feminist (born 1610)

Full date unknown

References 

 
Denmark
Years of the 17th century in Denmark